Rayonism (or Rayism or Rayonnism) was a style of abstract art that developed in Russia in 1910–1914. Founded and named by Russian Cubo-Futurists Mikhail Larionov and Natalia Goncharova, it was one of Russia's first abstract art movements.

Background

In 1909, Italian poet F. T. Marinetti published the Founding Manifesto of Futurism. The Futurists took speed, technology and modernity as their inspiration, depicting the dynamic character of early 20th century life; examples of Italian Futurists are Umberto Boccioni and Giacomo Balla. Shortly after the movement started, Russian Futurism, Ego-Futurism and Cubo-Futurism began; in Russia, the movement was developed by painter David Burliuk, poets Aleksei Kruchyonykh, Vasily Kamensky and Vladimir Mayakovsky, and many others. Larionov and Goncharova were early followers of Russian Futurism.

In 1910, the latter two people, together with many associates such as Aristarkh Lentulov and Ilya Mashkov, they founded the exhibiting society the Jack of Diamonds. However, in 1912, Goncharova and Larionov left, in protest at the group's reliance on French art, and organised their own rival exhibitions. It was then that Rayonism began, with a distinct vision of what abstract art was representative of. Larionov's approach to abstract painting was the idea that certain scientific principles, like radioactivity, ultraviolet light, and x-rays, were the foundation for the vision of what he wanted to create.

History of the movement

Goncharova began to paint in the Rayonist style as early as 1909, but the Rayonist Manifesto by her and Larionov was written in 1912, and published the subsequent year. In the manifesto, Larionov expresses the following, "Long live the style of Rayonist painting created by us, free from realistic forms, existing and developing itself only according to its own pictorial laws."

The Rayonists sought an art that floated beyond abstraction, outside time and space, and to break the barriers between the artist and the public. Rayonist paintings thus focused on the rays reflecting from the objects, and how the rays moved. They derived the name from the use of dynamic rays of contrasting color, representing lines of reflected light — "crossing of reflected rays from various objects".

At the famous 1913 Target exhibition, they introduced the style to the public. In their literature they described Rayonism as "naturally encompassing all existing styles and forms of the art of the past, as they, like life, are simply points of departure for a Rayonist perception and construction of a picture".

Larionov and Goncharova also wrote:

Later that same year, the Rayonists started painting their faces; in explanation, Larionov and fellow theoretician Ilia Zdanevich wrote the manifesto "Why We Paint Our Faces", which included suggested Rayonist face painting designs as illustrations.

Rayonism ended with the start of the Great War.

The movement received minimal acceptance for their influence on Russian abstract art until a few pieces were acquired by the Tate Gallery in 1952. There are few locations where works representative of this style can be viewed by the public outside of galleries primarily in London, New York, or Paris. Many exist in private collections, especially due to the long history of abstract art being frowned upon by the Soviet's.

Although short-lived, Rayonism was a crucial step in the development of Russian abstract art. As Larionov said, it represented the "true freeing of art" from the former "realistic" conventions that had "oppressed" the artistic community.

Electro act "The Rayonists" took their name from the movement.

See also
 Ray tracing (graphics)

References

External links
Tate Museum - Rayonism
 Rayonists and Futurists: A Manifesto — Natalia Goncharova, 1913

Modern art
Russian avant-garde